Thomas Novak, PhD, PE (born September 27, 1952 in Brownsville, Pennsylvania) is   the Alliance Coal Academic Chair of Mining Engineering at the University of Kentucky, appointed in 2010. Previously, he held appointments at the National Institute for Occupational Safety and Health, Virginia Tech, the University of Alabama and Pennsylvania State University. He received his PhD in mining engineering from the Pennsylvania State University in 1984. His research focuses on techniques to assess and improve mine safety and ventilation. His most recognized contributions to the field have been in understanding how electrical hazards such as lightning can trigger explosions in underground mines. This work has helped to explain a number of mine-related catastrophes in the last 30 years and has served to significantly improve mine safety.

He is a Fellow of the Institute of Electrical and Electronics Engineers (IEEE).

References

External links 
Thomas P. Novak, Microsoft Academic Search

Living people
American mining engineers
Mine safety
University of Kentucky faculty
National Institute for Occupational Safety and Health
Penn State College of Engineering alumni
People from Brownsville, Pennsylvania
1952 births
Engineers from Pennsylvania
Fellow Members of the IEEE
American electrical engineers